Yevhen Yevhenovych Shakhov (born 30 November 1990) is a Ukrainian professional footballer who plays as a central midfielder for the Ukraine national team.

Club career

Born in Dnipropetrovsk, Shakhov debuted on 7 April 2007 against rivals Stal Alchevsk as Dnipro lost 1–3. It was not until the 2010–11 season when his appearance for the Dnipro's senior squad became more regular. On 23 April 2015, on as a half-time substitute for Roman Bezus he scored the only goal of the tie as Dnipro eliminated Brugge to advance to the semi-finals of the UEFA Europa League. He left FC Dnipro Dnipropetrovsk having 127 appearances (17 goals, 13 assists) in all competitions.

PAOK
On 28 May 2016, the Ukrainian midfielder of Dnipro, whose current contract expires on 30 June 2016, will continue his career in Greece as a member of Superleague side PAOK signing a three years' contract for an undisclosed fee.

On 5 March 2017, he scored his first Superleague game, in the derby against champions Olympiacos, helping his club to obtain a 2–0 home win. On 27 April 2017, he scored the third goal in Greek Cup semifinals against Panathinaikos in a 4–0 helping his club to be promoted to the final against rivals AEK Athens. On 8 February 2018, he opened the score in a comfortable 3–1 away Greek Cup win against Atromitos helping his club to be promoted to semi-finals. It was his fifth goal for the 2017–18 Greek Football Cup. On 14 April 2018, he opened the score in a comfortable 3–1 home win against Panionios at Toumba Stadium (behind closed doors). On 29 April 2018, he scored in a 3–0 away win against struggling giants Panathinaikos, essentially occupied the second place in the 2017–18 season that leads in the preliminary round of UEFA Champions League.

On 19 January 2019, he scored his first goal for the 2018–19 season as he controlled a neat pass from Mauricio before scoring with a measured shot in a 3–0 home win game against Panionios. On 7 April 2019, Shakhov scored after Diego Biseswar precise cross, and this time the Ukrainian made no mistake with a powerful header in a 3–0 home win game against Lamia.
On 21 April 2019, scored a brace as PAOK finally ended their 34-year wait for a league title with a 5–0 win against relegated Levadiakos and win the Super League title. On 24 May 2019, after Fernando Varela declined PAOK's contract renewal offer, Yevhen Shakhov followed suit just one day later. The Ukrainian's contract was set to expire in the summer of 2019 and he met with club officials to discuss a new contract. However, PAOK's offer, reported at as a three-year contract with annual earnings of €700,000 (with bonuses), was nowhere near the 28-year-old's asking price and as a result, negotiations fell through.

Lecce
On 29 June 2019, he signed a deal with Italian Serie A newcomers Lecce.

AEK Athens
On 19 September 2020, Shakhov signed a two-year contract with the right to renew by team for one more year with Greek Super League club AEK Athens. On 1 November 2020, he scored his first goal, with an amazing solo effort, to help his team complete their comeback and take a 2–1 home win against OFI.

On 24 January 2021, he opened the score in a 2–2 away draw in the Double-headed eagles derby against PAOK, but didn't celebrate out of respect for his old team. On 27 November 2021, Shakhov came on as a late substitute and scored with a shot from outside the area, sealing a vital 2–1 away win against PAS Giannina.

International career
Shakhov's exceptional season with FC Dnipro Dnipropetrovsk was his passport to be called up by Mykhailo Fomenko to the provisional Euro 2016 squad. He was also called up to the 31-player squad for the 2018 FIFA World Cup qualification match against Iceland on 5 September 2016. On 15 November 2016, he scored his first goal with the Ukraine in a 2–0 home friendly game against Serbia.

Personal life
His father Yevhen Serhiyovych Shakhov was the top scorer of Soviet Top League in 1988 while also playing for Dnipro Dnipropetrovsk.

On 28 February 2022, at a time when the Russian invasion of Ukraine is underway and fighting is raging in Mariupol and on the outskirts of Kiev, the wife of Yevhen Shakhov, who was trapped in the Ukrainian capital, gave birth to their child. In the last few days, in a very advanced pregnancy, she was forced to live in a shelter to protect herself from the Russian attacks, with the AEK midfielder anxious about her fate and being in constant communication with her.

Career statistics

Club

International

International goals
Scores and results list Ukraine's goal tally first.

Honours

Club
Dnipro Dnipropetrovsk
UEFA Europa League runners-up: 2014–15

PAOK
Super League Greece: 2018–19
Greek Cup: 2016–17, 2017–18, 2018–19

International
Ukraine
UEFA European Under-19 Football Championship: 2009

References

External links

1990 births
Living people
Footballers from Dnipro
Association football midfielders
Ukrainian footballers
Ukrainian Premier League players
FC Dnipro players
FC Arsenal Kyiv players
Ukraine youth international footballers
Ukraine under-21 international footballers
PAOK FC players
Expatriate footballers in Greece
Ukrainian expatriate footballers
Ukrainian expatriate sportspeople in Greece
Super League Greece players
Ukraine international footballers
Serie A players
U.S. Lecce players
Expatriate footballers in Italy
Ukrainian expatriate sportspeople in Italy
AEK Athens F.C. players
FC Zorya Luhansk players